Thola Amadlozi is a studio album recorded by South African singer Brenda Fassie and produced by Sello Chicco Twala. The album sold over 400 000 copies in South Africa and won the Best Selling Album of the Year award at 2001 South African Music Awards.

Background 
Thola Amadlozi was released in 2000 by CCP Records. On 20 October 2009, the album was re-released by EMI Music South Africa (Pty) in digital. The album was accompanied by the release of a music video of the same name.

Track listing

Personnel 
 Brenda Fassie – Vocals

References

External links

2000 albums
Brenda Fassie albums